Hosemann is a surname. Notable people with the surname include:

Delbert Hosemann (born 1947), American politician
Marc Hosemann (born 1970), German actor
Theodor Hosemann (1807–1875), German genre painter, draftsman, illustrator, and caricaturist